Madoka Takagi (1956–2015) was a Japanese-American photographer known for her palladium prints of American city scenes. 

Her work is included in the collections of the Smithsonian American Art Museum, the Getty Museum, the Museum of Fine Arts Houston,  the Los Angeles County Museum of Art, the International Center of Photography, New York and the Museum of Modern Art, New York. In 2002 she was a fellows of the John Simon Guggenheim Memorial Foundation.

References

1956 births
2015 deaths
20th-century American photographers
21st-century American photographers
Artists in the Smithsonian American Art Museum collection